Alfred Teinitzer (29 July 1929 – 20 April 2021) was a midfielder who played for Austria in the 1954 FIFA World Cup. He also played for LASK.
Teinitzer was the last surviving member of Austria's 1954 World Cup squad.

References

1929 births
2021 deaths
Austrian footballers
Association football midfielders
Austria international footballers
1954 FIFA World Cup players
SK Rapid Wien players
LASK players
Footballers from Vienna